"Yumeji" is a pop-rock ballad by Japanese singer Tomiko Van. It is Van's third single that released on November 29, 2006. The cover jackets for the single were shot in a countryside not faraway from the city of Tokyo, and Van expressed that the covers would perfectly match the song. In the PV for the title track "Yumeji", Van follows a light through dark streets and finds a flower garden in the middle of trash. The single's B-side is entitled "Labyrinth" and is as "Yumeji" a lyric work of Van.

An acoustic version of Yumeji was included on her first album, Voice: Cover You With Love, as a bonus track.

Track listing

CD Portion

"Labyrinth"

"Labyrinth" -instrumental-

DVD Portion
CD

"Labyrinth"

"Labyrinth" -instrumental-

DVD
 Music Clips

Charts

References

2006 singles
Tomiko Van songs
Songs written by Tomiko Van
2006 songs
Avex Trax singles